Alampyris melanophiloides is a species of beetle in the family Cerambycidae. It was described by Thomson in 1868. It is known from Mexico.

References

Alampyris
Beetles described in 1868